The American Orchid Society Visitors Center and Botanical Garden was a  botanical garden specializing in orchids and home to the American Orchid Society. The facility was located in Morikami Park at 16700 AOS Lane, Delray Beach, Florida, United States, and included a 4,000 square foot (370 m2) greenhouse open to the public. The visitor center was a  Mediterranean style building that was designed by Song Associates of West Palm Beach, Florida.

In late 2011 the American Orchid Society sold the visitor center and garden and in 2012 moved the orchid collection to the Fairchild Tropical Botanic Garden in the Miami metropolitan area.

See also
 List of botanical gardens in the United States

References

Botanical gardens in Florida
Visitor centers in the United States
Delray Beach, Florida
Tourist attractions in Palm Beach County, Florida
Buildings and structures in Palm Beach County, Florida
Orchid organizations